Erin Mendenhall (born June 8, 1980) is an American politician who has been serving as the mayor of Salt Lake City, Utah since 2020. Upon taking office as Salt Lake City’s 36th mayor, Mendenhall became the city’s third and youngest woman in the role (after Deedee Corradini and Jackie Biskupski). Prior to assuming office, Mendenhall represented the city’s 5th district on the Salt Lake City Council.

Early life and education 
Mendenhall was born in Arizona and moved to Sandy, Utah, when she was seven. Mendenhall graduated from the University of Utah with a Bachelor of Arts degree in gender studies and a certificate in Non Profit Leadership and Management.

Career 
She was elected to the Salt Lake City council in early 2014, and improving air quality became her signature issue. It was reported in November 2014 that Erin Mendenhall and fellow council member Kyle LaMalfa were having an extramarital affair. (Colby Frazier, 13 November 2014). Two weeks later, Mendenhall confirmed a romantic relationship with LaMalfa. She and LaMalfa disclosed their relationship to City Attorney Margaret Plane, who stated there were no legal or ethical problems. Some city council members thought their relationship should remain private, while others thought the revelation was in the public's interest to the possibility of "perceived conflict." She and LaMalfa later married.

In the 2019 Salt Lake City mayoral election, Mendenhall defeated State Senator Luz Escamilla to become the 36th mayor of Salt Lake City. Mendenhall is the city's third female mayor (after Deedee Corradini and Jackie Biskupski).

In April 2020 during the COVID-19 pandemic, according to a police affidavit, Mendenhall was threatened by a man who "stated the mayor needs to open up the city. If she doesn’t, she’ll be forcibly removed from office. There’s a protest tomorrow and if things don’t change, a civil war is coming, and the police can’t stop me." The man was arrested and booked for making a terroristic threat and electronic communication harassment.

References

External links

 

21st-century American politicians
21st-century American women politicians
Living people
Mayors of Salt Lake City
Politicians from Salt Lake City
University of Utah alumni
Utah city council members
Utah Democrats
Women mayors of places in Utah
1980 births